Kentucky Route 8 is a  east–west state highway divided into two distinct segments across northern Kentucky. The western terminus of the route is at KY 237 near Francisville. The eastern terminus is at U.S. Route 23 in South Portsmouth. The two distinct segments of this route were not meant to be connected together. KY 8 from its west end in Boone County to Augusta in Bracken County is designated as a part of an identified corridor for bikes named the Ramblin' River Tour by the American Association of State Highway and Transportation Officials (AASHTO). 

KY 8 is named the Mary Ingles Highway for part of its length. It is rumored that she was the first white woman in Kentucky. Captured by Indians in Virginia in 1755 and taken to Ohio, she later escaped a salt-making party at Big Bone Lick and made her way across the Kentucky wilderness back home to Virginia.

Route description

Western segment
The western segment of KY 8, the longer of the two, extends  between rural Boone County and Maysville. KY 8 begins 1.5 miles west of Kentucky Route 237 along River Road near Francisville. The route runs parallel to the Ohio River as it heads eastward, passing through Covington, Newport, and Augusta before ending at an intersection with US 62 in Maysville. 

KY 8 has been re-routed from its original path along Mary Ingles Highway in Fort Thomas due to a landslide. According to Mike Bezold, a member of the Kentucky Transport Cabinet, the cost to repair the damaged section of road would be $50 million despite having a low amount of drivers.  Now, KY 8 follows KY 1998 out of Silver Grove until it meets up with US 27 in Cold Spring. It then returns to its original route in Newport, but creates a small spur through Bellevue and Dayton. Its previous route along Mary Ingles Highway in Fort Thomas has since been replaced with KY 445 to between Industrial Road and River Road. The rest of the route up to Dayton has since been reclassified as KY 6335. The Ramblin' River Tour which inhabits the part of the KY 8 that has been closed has not been redesignated as bicycles are still able to pass the landslide with ease.

Eastern segment
The western terminus of this portion is a very narrow two-lane road that becomes gravel.

From Kentucky Route 3037 in Vanceburg to its eastern terminus at US 23, KY 8 was formerly designated Kentucky Route 10, with KY 8 ending at KY 3037 (then KY 10). The road became part of KY 8 in the late-1990s after KY 10 was rerouted onto the AA Highway to the south.

Major intersections

Western segment

Eastern segment

References

External links
KentuckyRoads.com KY 8

0008